Azelota is a genus of grasshoppers belonging to the family Acrididae.

The species of this genus are found in Australia.

Species:

Azelota diversipes 
Azelota parvula 
Azelota pilipes

References

Acrididae